Robert Leslie Goode (June 5, 1927 – June 9, 2007) was an American football running back for the Washington Redskins and the Philadelphia Eagles of the National Football League.  He played college football at Texas A&M University and was drafted in the first round of the 1949 NFL Draft by the Redskins. He was also drafted by the Chicago Bears in the 15th round of the 1948 NFL Draft and the Buffalo Bills (AAFC) in the 16th round of the 1949 AAFC Draft.

References

1927 births
2007 deaths
People from Fisher County, Texas
Players of American football from Texas
American football running backs
Texas A&M Aggies football players
Philadelphia Eagles players
Washington Redskins players
Eastern Conference Pro Bowl players